Theloderma stellatum is a species of frog in the family Rhacophoridae. It is found in Thailand, Cambodia, Laos, and Vietnam.
Its natural habitats are subtropical or tropical moist lowland forests, subtropical or tropical moist montane forests, and plantations.
It is threatened by habitat loss. This species deposits eggs in rain water collected in small tree holes; the tadpoles feed on the organic matter aggregated in a tannin-rich rain water. Notches aiming resin collection increase carrying capacity of the frogs providing additional breeding sites.

References

Theloderma
Amphibians of Cambodia
Amphibians of Laos
Amphibians of Thailand
Amphibians of Vietnam
Taxa named by Edward Harrison Taylor
Amphibians described in 1962
Taxonomy articles created by Polbot